Koolvac was a robotic vacuum cleaner sold in the U.S. by former iRobot distributor Koolatron, owned by Canadian Urus Industrial Corp. iRobot filed a lawsuit against Koolatron, claiming that Koolvac was an unauthorized copy of their Roomba model. iRobot won the court case and Koolatron was prohibited from further sales of Koolvacs within the United States. All unsold units had to be destroyed or exported out of the U.S. by October 2005.

See also
 List of vacuum cleaners

References
"iRobot Targets Roomba Knockoff", PC Magazine - May 10, 2005. Retrieved 2011-01-23
"IRobot patent win sweeps rival out of U.S.", Boston Business Journal - August 25, 2005. Retrieved 2011-01-23

Robotic vacuum cleaners
Robots of Canada
2000s robots